Amit Rana (born 14 December 1995) is an Indian cricketer. He made his List A debut for Haryana in the 2016–17 Vijay Hazare Trophy on 26 February 2017. He made his first-class debut for Haryana in the 2017–18 Ranji Trophy on 6 October 2017.

References

External links
 

1995 births
Living people
Indian cricketers
Haryana cricketers
Place of birth missing (living people)